The New Zealand Warriors 2002 season was the New Zealand Warriors 8th first-grade season. The club competed in Australasia's National Rugby League. The coach of the team was Daniel Anderson while Stacey Jones was the club captain. The club finished the year as minor premiers and made the grand final for the first time, however they were defeated 30–8 by the Sydney Roosters.

Milestones
14 April – Round 5: The Warriors have a then record win (68–10) over the Northern Eagles.
14 April – Round 5: Stacey Jones played in his 150th first grade match for the club, the first person to reach the milestone.
14 April – Round 5: Ivan Cleary scores 28 points in a match (1 try, 12 goals), equaling the club's point scoring record set by Gene Ngamu in 1996.
23 June – Round 15: Henry Fa'afili played in his 50th match for the club.
18 August – Round 23: Clinton Toopi played in his 50th match for the club.
1 September – Round 25: Jerry Seuseu played in his 100th match for the club.
6 September – Round 26: Ivan Cleary played in his 50th match for the club.
The Warriors claim the NRL minor premiership for the first time. The Warriors received A$100,000 prize money for finishing the regular season as minor premiers.
Daniel Anderson is named Dally M Coach of the Year and Ali Lauitiiti Dally M Second Rower of the Year.
15 September: – The Warriors host their first finals match, beating Canberra 36–20 at a sold-out Ericsson Stadium.

Jersey and sponsors

Fixtures 

The Warriors used Ericsson Stadium as their home ground in 2002, their only home ground since they entered the competition in 1995.

Pre-season trials

Regular season

Final series

Grand Final

First Half

In the 23rd minute, Sydney opened the scoring with a try to Shannon Hegarty with Craig Fitzgibbon converting taking Sydney to a 6–0 lead. Not long after, Ivan Cleary got New Zealand on the board with a penalty goal making the score 6–2, which remained that scoreline until halftime.

Second Half

In the 46th minute, New Zealand took the lead for the first time through a Stacey Jones try and an Ivan Cleary conversion taking the scoreline to 8–6. Approaching the 60th minute, Sydney regained the lead with Craig Wing scoring the try and Craig Fitgibbon converting another to make the score 12–8 after a spectacular 40/20 kick from Sydney captain Brad Fittler. In the last 15 minutes Craig Fitzgibbon, Chris Flannery and Bryan Fletcher scored tries for Sydney with Craig Fizgibbon converting all three to take Sydney to a 30–8 win. By winning the grand final the Roosters also received A$400,000 in prize money.

Clive Churchill Medal: Craig Fitzgibbon

When They Scored

23rd Minute: Sydney 6–0 (Hegarty try; Fitzgibbon goal)
29th Minute: Sydney 6–2 (Cleary goal)
46th Minute: New Zealand 8–6 (Jones try; Cleary goal)
58th Minute: Sydney 12–8 (Wing try; Fitzgibbon goal)
65th Minute: Sydney 18–8 (Fitzgibbon try; Fitzgibbon goal)
71st Minute: Sydney 24–8 (Flannery try; Fitzgibbon goal)
75th Minute: Sydney 30–8 (Fletcher try; Fitzgibbon goal)

Ladder

Squad 

Twenty-nine players were used by the Warriors in 2002, including six players who made their first grade debuts.

Staff
Chief executive officer: Mick Watson

Coaching staff
Head coach: Daniel Anderson
Assistant coach: Tony Kemp
Video analysis: Rohan Smith

Transfers

Gains

Losses

Other teams

Players not required by the Warriors were released to play in the 2002 Bartercard Cup. This included Iafeta Paleaaesina and Karl Temata for the Hibiscus Coast Raiders, Sione Faumuina for the Glenora Bears, Evarn Tuimavave for the Marist-Richmond Brothers, Vinnie Anderson for the Mount Albert Lions, Jeremiah Pai for the Otahuhu Leopards, Logan Swann for the Eastern Tornadoes and Henry Fa'afili and Lance Hohaia for the Manurewa Marlins.

Awards
Ali Lauiti'iti won the club's Player of the Year award.

References

External links
Warriors official site
2002 Warriors Season at rugbyleagueproject.org

New Zealand Warriors seasons
New Zealand Warriors season
War